Wellington Santos da Silva or simply Wellington (born August 17, 1985, in Guarulhos, Brazil) is a Brazilian left back who last played for FK Liepājas Metalurgs in Latvia.

Earlier clubs
Wellington began his career in his home country with União São João in São Paulo. Following attention from various São Paulo (state) clubs, he then loaned for América-SP and Ituano and also loaned to the German Club Mainz.

Grêmio
At the close of the 2005 season (May 2, 2006) he moved to Grêmio, and there he won Rio Grande do Sul State League in 2006 (including a good participation in the Brazilian League).

Corinthians
In 2007, he loaned signed to Sport Club Corinthians Paulista until 31 December 2007, to play Campeonato Brasileiro Série A 2007.

Mainz 05
On August 31, 2007, the German club 1. FSV Mainz 05 loaned him, to play in the German 2. Fußball-Bundesliga and try to help the club to reclimb into the 1. Fußball-Bundesliga.

Nacional
In 2008, he signed for Nacional from Portugal. He then played in the UEFA Europa League.

Liepājas Metalurgs
On March 30, 2010 he was signed by the Latvian champions FK Liepājas Metalurgs. He signed a contract until June 1, 2010. On 1 May 2010 in a league match against Daugava Daugavpils Wellington suffered a serious knee injury and was taken to hospital right away. The medical tests showed that the injury was too serious to play and Wellington is expected not to play at least for a half year. On May 13 Liepājas Metalurgs announced that Wellington had been released and had already gone back home to Brazil to treat his injury there.

Honours
Rio Grande do Sul State League: 2006

References

External links
 sambafoot
 CBF
 zerozero.pt
 globoesporte
 Guardian Stats Centre
 Brasilianer Wellington für Mainz spielberechtigt

1985 births
People from Guarulhos
Living people
Brazilian footballers
União São João Esporte Clube players
Ituano FC players
América Futebol Clube (SP) players
Grêmio Foot-Ball Porto Alegrense players
Sport Club Corinthians Paulista players
1. FSV Mainz 05 players
Expatriate footballers in Germany
Expatriate footballers in Latvia
Brazilian expatriates in Latvia
FK Liepājas Metalurgs players
Association football fullbacks
Footballers from São Paulo (state)